The 2007–08 Nemzeti Bajnokság I, also known as NB I, was the 106th season of top-tier football in Hungary. The league was officially named Soproni Liga for sponsoring reasons. The season started on 20 July 2007 and ended on 2 June 2008.

League standings

Results

Statistics

Top goalscorers

References
Hungary - List of final tables (RSSSF)

Nemzeti Bajnokság I seasons
1
Hungary